Suryakant Acharya (9 December 1929 – 21 December 2009) was an Indian politician of the Bharatiya Janata Party and a member of the Parliament of India representing Gujarat in the Rajya Sabha, the upper house of the Indian Parliament.

He was elected from  Gujarat State in Rajya Sabha, the Council of States of India parliament for the 2005 to 2011.

He was Vice Chairman of State Planning Commission of Gujarat from June 1998 to January 2003.

He was married to Hemaben Acharya who was Minister of Health at Govt of Gujarat during 1975–80. They had one son.

References

External links
 Profile on Rajya Sabha website

Rajya Sabha members from Gujarat
1929 births
2009 deaths
Bharatiya Jana Sangh politicians
Bharatiya Janata Party politicians from Gujarat
Janata Party politicians
People from Junagadh
Rajya Sabha members from the Bharatiya Janata Party